George Roland Malby (September 16, 1857 in Canton, St. Lawrence County, New York – July 5, 1912 in New York City) was an American politician from New York. He was Speaker of the New York State Assembly in 1894, and served three terms in Congress.

Life
He attended Canton Union School and St. Lawrence University. He studied law, was admitted to the bar in 1881, and commenced the practice of law in Ogdensburg, New York.

Malby was the Justice of the Peace of Oswegatchie, New York.

He was a member of the New York State Assembly in 1891, 1892 (both St. Lawrence Co., 1st D.), 1893, 1894 and 1895 (all three St. Lawrence Co.); and was Minority Leader in 1893, and Speaker in 1894.

He was a member of the New York State Senate (32nd D.) from 1896 to 1906, sitting in the  119th, 120th, 121st, 122nd, 123rd, 124th, 125th, 126th, 127th, 128th and 129th New York State Legislatures.

Malby was elected as a Republican to the 60th, 61st and 62nd United States Congresses, holding office from March 4, 1907, until his death.  On December 13, 1911, Malby was the sole dissenter when the House voted 300–1 to terminate relations with Russia based on that nation's discrimination against Jews.

He was buried at Ogdensburg Cemetery in Ogdensburg, N.Y.

See also
List of United States Congress members who died in office (1900–49)

References

External links

 George R. Malby, late a representative from New York, Memorial addresses delivered in the House of Representatives and Senate frontispiece 1913

1857 births
1912 deaths
St. Lawrence University alumni
Speakers of the New York State Assembly
Republican Party New York (state) state senators
Republican Party members of the New York State Assembly
People from Canton, New York
Republican Party members of the United States House of Representatives from New York (state)
19th-century American politicians